Brigadier-General William Newton (died 10 November 1730) was an officer of the British Army.

Career
Newton was commissioned as a lieutenant in the 1st Regiment of Foot Guards, with the rank of captain in the Army, on 9 November 1692. He served in the wars of King William III, and was wounded at the siege of Namur in 1695. On 13 February 1702 he was appointed major of Sir Richard Temple's newly raised Regiment of Foot, and served in the wars of Queen Anne, being promoted to lieutenant-colonel commanding the regiment on 25 August 1704, brevet colonel on 1 January 1707, and colonel of the regiment on 24 April 1710.

On 22 July 1715 Newton was made colonel of a newly raised regiment of dragoons, and on 28 September 1722 he transferred to the colonelcy of the regiment later numbered the 39th Regiment of Foot. He was promoted to brigadier-general on 4 March 1727, while serving with his regiment at the thirteenth siege of Gibraltar.

References

1730 deaths
British Army generals
Grenadier Guards officers
39th Regiment of Foot officers
British military personnel of the Nine Years' War
British military personnel of the War of the Spanish Succession
Year of birth unknown
British military personnel of the Anglo-Spanish War (1727–1729)